= Snow Flake Grigsby =

Snow Flake Grigsby (13 February 1899 – 22 March 1981) was an African American civil rights activist and trade unionist. Grigsby was born in Newberry County, South Carolina, to two farmers in a family of twelve children. He received his high school diploma from Harbison Junior College in 1923, and he attended the Detroit Institute of Technology. Grigsby went on to become a postal employee while raising a son and daughter with his wife Eliza Red. Grigsby died after a long battle with cancer at the age of 82. He died in Harper Hospital in Detroit, Michigan. Grigsby was a civil rights activist for 5 decades. He used mass protest and organized his community to rally for equality in public affairs such as housing and jobs.

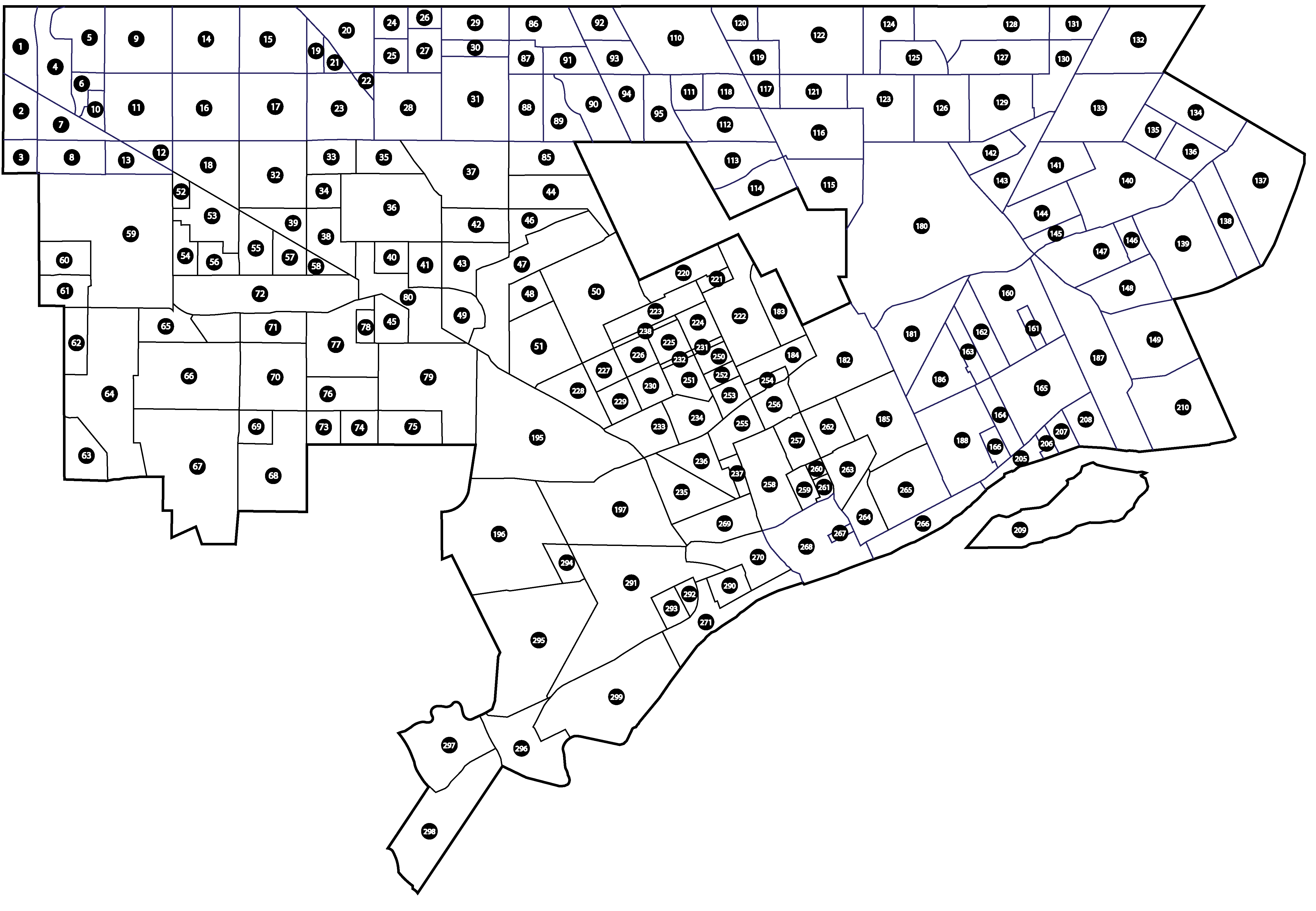
Map of Detroit, where Snow Flake Grigsby resided.
